Batoscelis is a genus of beetles in the family Carabidae, containing the following species:

 Batoscelis clivinoides (Alluaud, 1897) 
 Batoscelis discipennis (Dejean, 1831) 
 Batoscelis gerardi (Burgeon, 1935) 
 Batoscelis hellmichi (Jedlicka, 1965) 
 Batoscelis leontovitchi Basilewsky, 1951 
 Batoscelis luctuosa (Peringuey, 1896) 
 Batoscelis luticola (Alluaud, 1897) 
 Batoscelis nigra (Basilewsky, 1946) 
 Batoscelis oblongus (Dejean, 1831) 
 Batoscelis perrieri Jeannel, 1948 
 Batoscelis porosus (Putzeys, 1863) 
 Batoscelis promontorii (Peringuey, 1896)

References

Harpalinae